Epiplema himala is a species of moth of the  family Uraniidae. It is found in Asia, including India and China.

References

Moths described in 1880
Uraniidae
Insects of China
Moths of Asia